Copenhagen Wolves RFC is the rugby section of Pan Idræt. The section is a member of the Danish Rugby Union and the International Gay Rugby. 
The Wolves is an inclusive rugby team in Copenhagen and currently has around 30 members, with a variety of nationalities, cultural backgrounds, skill levels, sexual orientation and gender identities.

The Wolves are passionate about being visible within the LGBT+ and rugby community in Denmark and on social media. The club has campaigned actively for the inclusion of transgender players. 

The group aims to diversify and help grow the rugby community in Denmark by providing an inclusive space for anyone who is interested in playing rugby or supporting the team.

External links 
 Pan Idræt
 Danish Rugby Union
 International Gay Rugby
 Wolves Facebook
 Wolves Instagram
 Wolves webpage

Danish rugby union teams
International Gay Rugby member clubs